Montgomery-Wehrman Airport  is a privately owned, public use airport located four nautical miles (5 mi, 7 km) northeast of the central business district of Montgomery City, in Montgomery County, Missouri, United States.

Facilities and aircraft 
Montgomery-Wehrman Airport covers an area of 11 acres (4 ha) at an elevation of 778 feet (237 m) above mean sea level. It has one runway designated 3/21 with a turf and gravel surface measuring 2,360 by 75 feet (719 x 23 m).

For the 12-month period ending January 31, 2010, the airport had 990 aircraft operations, an average of 82 per month: 93% general aviation and 7% air taxi. At that time there were five aircraft based at this airport, all single-engine.

References

External links 
 Aerial image as of March 1996 from USGS The National Map

Airports in Missouri
Montgomery County, Missouri